Jannik Schümann (born 22 July, 1992) is a German actor. He received three Jupiter Awards for Best Actor, for his role of Danny in Close to the Horizon (2020), 9 Days Awake (2021), and the role of Franz Joseph I. in Sisi (2022). He is also known for his role in The Aftermath (2019), Center of My World (2016), The Diplomat (2016–2023), Monster Hunter (2020), Tribes of Europa (2021), or Charité at War (2019).

Early Life
Schümann was born in Hamburg, Germany, where he grew up with two older brothers in the rural quarter Kirchwerder in the Bergedorf borough. As a child, Schümann took an interest in dancing and playing the piano, which earned him the role of young Mozart in the German premiere of the Little Mozart musical at the Neuer Flora theater in Hamburg when he was 9 years old. After the performance, a talent agent approached him at a gas station while he was buying a chocolate bar, and handed him her business card. Schümann signed a contract with her and enrolled in acting classes at the New Talent Schauspielschule.

Career

Schümann made his screen debut at the age of 11 when he made an appearance in an episode of the medical drama TV series The Air Rescue Team. At the age of 12, he lent his voice to the main character of the German radio drama adaptation of Oscar and the Lady in Pink, a novel by Éric-Emmanuel Schmitt. When he was 15, he was cast in the two-part film Das Glück am anderen Ende der Welt. Throughout his teenage years, he appeared in TV series, films, theater, radio dramas, and also dubbed characters in cartoon films.

Schümann rose to prominence in 2011 at the age of 17 in a supporting role in Homevideo, a cyberbullying drama, where he portrayed Henry who cyberbullies a classmate, the main character portrayed by Jonas Nay, into committing suicide. The film received critical acclaim, winning numerous awards including the Deutscher Fernsehpreis for Best TV film. Schümann's performance earned him the New Faces Award nomination for Best Young Actor. In the following year, he was cast in a supporting role in Barbara as well as in Mittlere Reife, where he portrayed a young drug dealer, for which he was awarded the Special Jury Prize at the Hessischer Fernsehpreis 2012, along with the ensemble cast.

In 2013, Schümann starred as the manipulative teenager Alev El Quamar in Gaming Instinct, a drama film adaptation of Juli Zeh's novel of the same name. In 2015, he was cast in the leading role of a transgender teenager in Call Me Helen. In 2016, he starred as the love interest of Louis Hofmann in Center of My World, a gay coming-of-age drama dubbed by The Hollywood Reporter as "a beguiling teen romance", while described by The Guardian as "genuinely cute". The film received a 100% rating by film critics on Roten Tomatoes, as well as numerous international awards and nominations. It is an adaptation of Andreas Steinhöfel’s award-winning eponymous young adult novel.

In 2017, Schümann was cast as the lead in the critically acclaimed dystopian drama Jugend ohne Gott, opposite of Jannis Niewöhner. In the same year, he was cast as Albrecht von Schlacht in the comedy High Society. In 2019, he appeared alongside Keira Knightley in the British historical drama The Aftermath, as well as in the second season of drama series Charité, distributed by Netflix. The story is set in the hospital Charité in Berlin during the Second World War. Schümann portrays Otto, the main character's brother, a homosexual student of medicine who opposes the Nazi regime. After serving his military duty, he returns from war to work in the hospital, where he falls in love with Martin. They keep their affair a secret in fear of Martin being sent to a concentration camp over Paragraph 175, a German law that made homosexual acts a crime.

In 2019, the romantic drama Close to the Horizon was released, with Schümann in the leading role. He portrayed model and kickboxer Danny Taylor, a survivor of severe child sexual abuse who was infected with HIV by his father. The film is an adaptation of Jessica Koch's best-selling book about her real life relationship with Danny Taylor. The film follows Jessica, played by Luna Wedler, trying to navigate a relationship with a severe childhood trauma survivor who is HIV positive in a time when there was no effective antiretroviral medication to prevent the HIV infection from developing into an AIDS diagnosis. Schümann's performance earned him his first Jupiter Award for Best Actor.

In the following year, Schümann appeared in Monster Hunter, starring Mila Jovovich, and landed the leading role in 9 Days Awake, a drama film about Eric, a crystal meth addict, battling drug addiction since he was 14. Schümann's portrayal of a drug addict earned him his second Jupiter Award for Best Actor.

As of 2021, he portrays Franz Joseph I. in the award-winning historical drama series Sisi. The role earned Schümann his third Jupiter Award for Best Actor. In February 2023, the series was renewed for the third season.

Activism and other ventures
On 26 December 2020, Schümann published a photo on Instagram with his partner Felix Kruck, a move interpreted by the international media outlets as his public coming out as gay. In 2021, Schümann criticized the coming out narrative and explained that he had never made a secret of his homosexuality, stating that he only published the photo of his partner "as a signal of support for the LGBTQ community. In February 2021, he was one of 185 actors who signed the #ActOut Manifesto, an initiative by queer German actors to achieve visibility and diversity in film and theater.

On the International Holocaust Remembrance Day on January 27th, 2023, he gave a speech in the German Parliament officially commemorating the LGBTQ victims of the Nazi regime for the first time in the country's history.

Personal Life
Schümann is studying English Studies and Media Studies at Humboldt University of Berlin. His father and two brothers are bricklayers. He lives with his partner Felix Kruck in Berlin.

Filmography

Awards
 2012: Nomination for the New Faces Award for Homevideo (Best young actor)
 2012: Hessischer Fernsehpreis  special award of the jury for Mittlere Reife (together with Isabel Bongard, Sonja Gerhardt, Vincent Redetzki, Anton Rubtsov)
 2016: Askania Award (Shooting-Star-Award)
2020: Jupiter Award – Best National Actor
2020: GQ Care Award – Best Look
2021: Jupiter Award – Best National Actor
2022: Jupiter Award – Best National Actor

References

External links
 
 

1992 births
Living people
German gay actors
German LGBT rights activists
German male child actors
German male film actors
German male television actors
German male voice actors
Male actors from Hamburg
21st-century German male actors